Pain Qazi Mahalleh (also Romanized as Pā’īn Qāẕī Maḩalleh; also known as Qāẕī Maḩalleh-ye Pā’īn and Ya‘qūbīyeh) is a village in Daryasar Rural District, Kumeleh District, Langarud County, Gilan Province, Iran. The village was called Payin Rudpass before the immigration of some Sayyid families from Ramsar to the region. At the 2006 census, its population was 736, in 201 families.

References 

Populated places in Langarud County